Deborah Jean Howard (February 13, 1967 – July 24, 2009) was an American beauty pageant titleholder. She was crowned Miss New Hampshire 1991 and competed for the Miss America 1992 title. Howard was a graduate of Concord High School in Concord, New Hampshire, and Plymouth State University in Plymouth, New Hampshire. She earned a bachelor's degree in English in 1989 and a master's degree in special education in 2007. After her reign, she continued acting, singing, and dancing in community productions and teaching Sunday school. She became a school teacher and a drama coach. She died on July 24, 2009, in a car accident on Interstate 93. She was 42.

References

External links
Miss New Hampshire official website

1967 births
2009 deaths
American beauty pageant winners
Educators from New Hampshire
American women educators
Miss America 1992 delegates
People from Concord, New Hampshire
Plymouth State University alumni
Road incident deaths in New Hampshire
20th-century American people
21st-century American women